Visa requirements for Ecuadorian citizens are administrative entry restrictions by the authorities of other states placed on citizens of Ecuador. As of 2 June 2022, Ecuadorian citizens had visa-free or visa on arrival access to 93 countries and territories, ranking the Ecuadorian passport 58th in terms of travel freedom according to the Henley Passport Index.

Citizens of Ecuador do not need a passport when travelling to Argentina, Bolivia, Brazil, Chile, Colombia, Paraguay, Peru, and Uruguay. For these countries, they may use just their national identification cards. [CAN's treaty] [Mercosur's treaty]

Most South American countries do not require a passport as a document to allow Ecuadorian citizens to visit their countries as tourist; a national or state-issued ID card is enough. Nevertheless, this piece of identification must be in good conservation state and less than ten years from its issue date, according to agreements signed in Mercosur's treaties.

Visa requirements map

Visa requirements 
Visa requirements for holders of normal passports traveling for tourist purposes:

Ecuador is an associated member of Mercosur. As such, its citizens enjoy unlimited access to any of the full members (Argentina, Brazil, Paraguay and Uruguay) and other associated members (Bolivia, Chile, Colombia and Peru) with the right to residence and work, with no requirement other than nationality. Citizens of these nine countries (including Ecuador) may apply for the grant of "temporary residence" for up to two years in another country of the bloc. Then, they may apply for "permanent residence" just before the term of their "temporary residence" expires.

Unrecognized or partially recognized countries

See also

Visa policy of Ecuador
Ecuadorian passport

References and Notes
References

Notes

Ecuador
Foreign relations of Ecuador